WFCB-LP (100.3 FM) was a radio station broadcasting a religious radio format. Formerly licensed to Dublin, New Hampshire, United States, the station was owned by Kingdom Christian Ministries, Inc.

The station's license was cancelled and its call sign deleted by the FCC on November 17, 2011.

References

External links
Kingdom Christian Ministries
 

Defunct religious radio stations in the United States
FCB-LP
FCB-LP
Moody Radio affiliate stations
Defunct radio stations in the United States
Radio stations established in 2005
Radio stations disestablished in 2011
2005 establishments in New Hampshire
2011 disestablishments in New Hampshire
FCB-LP